Mikhail Viktorovich Kolesnikov (born 8 September 1966) is a former Russian professional footballer.

Honours
 Soviet Top League champion: 1991.
 Soviet Top League runner-up: 1990.
 Soviet Cup winner: 1991.
 Soviet Cup finalist: 1992.
 Russian Cup finalist: 1993.

European club competitions
With PFC CSKA Moscow.

 UEFA Cup Winners' Cup 1991–92: 2 goals.
 UEFA Champions League 1992–93: 3 games, 1 goal.

External links
 

1966 births
Footballers from Moscow
Living people
Soviet footballers
Russian footballers
PFC CSKA Moscow players
Soviet Top League players
Russian Premier League players
Association football midfielders
FC Spartak Moscow players